The following are the national records in athletics in Samoa maintained by its national athletics federation: Athletics Samoa (AS).

Outdoor

Key to tables:

h = hand timing

a = automatic timing

w = windy conditions

A = affected by altitude

# = not officially ratified by federation or/and IAAF

OT = oversized track (> 200m in circumference)

Men

Women

Indoor

Men

Women

References

External links
 SA web site

Samoa
Records
Athletics
Athletics